Elections were held in the organized municipalities in the Parry Sound District of Ontario on October 24, 2022 in conjunction with municipal elections across the province.

The Archipelago
Bert Liverance was re-elected reeve of The Archipelago by acclamation.

Armour
Ron Ward was elected mayor of Armour by acclamation.

Burk's Falls
The following were the results for mayor of Burk's Falls.

Callander
Mayor Robb Noon was challenged by municipal councillor Daryl Vaillancourt and Gay Smylie.

Carling
The following were the results for mayor of Carling.

Joly
Brian McCabe was elected mayor of Joly by acclamation.

Kearney
The following were the results for mayor of Kearney.

Machar
The following were the results for mayor of Machar.

Magnetawan
The following were the results for mayor of Magnetawan.

McDougall
The following were the results for mayor of McDougall.

McKellar
The following were the results for mayor of McKellar.

McMurrich/Monteith
The following candidates are running for reeve of McMurrich/Monteith.

Nipissing
Thomas C. Piper was re-elected as mayor of Nipissing by acclamation.

Parry Sound
The following were the results for mayor of Parry Sound.

Perry
Norm Hofstetter was re-elected as mayor of Perry by acclamation.

Powassan
The following were the results for mayor of Powassan.

Ryerson

Seguin
Ann MacDiarmid was re-elected by acclamation.

South River
Jim Coleman was re-elected mayor of South River by acclamation.

Strong
The following were the results for mayor of Strong.

Sundridge
The following were the results for mayor of Sundridge.

Whitestone
George Comrie was re-elected mayor of Whitestone by acclamation.

References

Parry Sound
Parry Sound District